Belapur may refer to:

 CBD Belapur, Mumbai, India
Belapur, Nepal
Belapur, Shrirampur, Maharashtra, India